Alida de Vries (Alida Elisabeth Christina "Ali" De Vries, married name Gerritsen; 9 August 1914 – 20 January 2007) was a Dutch athlete, who finished in fifth position at the 1936 Summer Olympics in the 4 x 100 m relay event alongside Kitty ter Braake, Fanny Blankers-Koen and Elisabeth Koning. She was born in Den Helder. She died at the age of 92 in her hometown Amsterdam.

References

1914 births
2007 deaths
Dutch sports executives and administrators
Dutch female sprinters
Olympic athletes of the Netherlands
Athletes (track and field) at the 1936 Summer Olympics
People from Den Helder
Olympic female sprinters